Koren Grieveson is an Angolan American chef who has appeared on several cooking television shows.

Career
Grieveson has worked in Chicago and New York restaurants and appeared on Top Chef (season 4, judge) and Iron Chef America (season 7, contestant).

Awards and honors
James Beard Foundation Award 2010  Best Chef Great Lakes for her work at Avec in Chicago
Food & Wine named her a Best New Chef in 2008

Personal life
Grieveson was born in Luanda, Angola where her father was working in the poultry industry.  They moved to different countries around the world before settling in Glastonbury, Connecticut. She joined the Army and served for eight years. When she left, Grieveson catered for rock bands in New York, at Lollapalooza and for bands on tour. She ended up graduating from The Culinary Institute of America (CIA).  She worked at various restaurants around the country before becoming executive chef at Resto in New York City.

She was engaged to Anne Burrell. They got engaged in 2012 in Vieques, Puerto Rico but kept it secret even though their relationship was not.  Until Burrell publicly announced their engagement on December 31, 2012.  The couple never married and eventually split up.

References

LGBT chefs
American women chefs
People from Luanda
Culinary Institute of America Hyde Park alumni
James Beard Foundation Award winners
Angolan LGBT people
Reality cooking competition contestants
Top Chef